Line 5 of the Changsha Metro is a rapid transit line in Changsha. The line opened on 28 June 2020 with 18 stations.

History 
Construction started on the line in November 2015, with trial running beginning on 30 December 2019. The line was opened to the public on 28 June 2020.

Opening timeline

Rolling stock 
The line is operated by 14 six-car Type B trainsets with permanent-magnet traction motors.

Stations

References

Changsha Metro lines
2020 establishments in China
Railway lines opened in 2020